PowerUp Forever is a downloadable multi-directional shooter developed by Blitz Arcade and published by Namco Bandai for the Xbox 360 via Xbox Live Arcade and the PlayStation 3 via PlayStation Network. It was released on Xbox Live Arcade on December 10, 2008 and the PlayStation Network on December 11, 2008. The title is a reference to the game Warning Forever, which was one of the influences for the game (the others being Geometry Wars and Katamari Damacy.)

Gameplay

The player controls a ship, with dual analog controls similar to Robotron 2084 and Geometry Wars; the left thumbstick controls the ship's movement, while the right thumbstick aims the weapon. The player flies in a fluidic space, trying to kill parasites to attract the level boss. Killing the boss awards the player a new ability, such as lasers, plasma arcs, shields and upgraded weaponry.

Killing the boss causes the player's ship to grow, causing former enemies to shrink and introducing new enemies from the background to the fore, similar to Spore's Cellular phase.

Reception
IGN awarded PowerUp Forever a 6.5 of 10, praising its unique look, calling it "part Schizoid, part Geometry Wars, and part Flow", but criticized the relative lack of variety in gameplay.

References

External links
PowerUp Forever at IGN

2008 video games
Multidirectional shooters
Bandai Namco games
PlayStation 3 games
PlayStation Network games
Video games developed in the United Kingdom
Xbox 360 Live Arcade games
Blitz Games Studios games
Single-player video games